Anatoliy Dmitrievich Yartsev (born 16 January 1993) is a Russian badminton player. He competed at the 2013 Kazan Universiade.

Achievements

BWF International Challenge/Series (6 titles, 7 runners-up) 
Men's singles

Men's doubles

Mixed doubles

  BWF International Challenge tournament
  BWF International Series tournament
  BWF Future Series tournament

References

External links 

 

1993 births
Living people
Russian male badminton players